Jatna’s bent-toed gecko (Cyrtodactylus jatnai) is a species of lizard in the family Gekkonidae. The species is endemic to Indonesia.

Etymology
The specific name, jatnai is in honor of Indonesian conservationist Jatna Supriatna.

Geographic range
C. jatnai is found in western Bali, Indonesia.

Description

Reproduction
The mode of reproduction of C. jatnai is unknown.

References

Further reading
 

Cyrtodactylus
Reptiles described in 2020